Meg Thalken in Washington, District of Columbia) is an American stage, film and television actress, known to television viewers for her work on ER.

Filmography 

Chicago Story (1 episode, 1982) (TV)
Class (1983)
Through Naked Eyes (1983) (TV Movie)
Jack and Mike (1 episode, 1987)
Poltergeist III (1988)
The Babe (1992)
The Untouchables (1 episode, 1993)
A Family Thing (1996)
Early Edition (1 episode, 1996)

EZ Streets (2 episodes, 1996–1997)
ER (7 episodes, 1996–2008)
Chicago Hope (1 episode, 1997)
U.S. Marshals (1998)
Turks (1 episode, 1999)
What About Joan (1 episode, 2001)
Dragonfly (2002) (uncredited)
Check Please (2007)
Hannah Free (2009)
Henry Gamble's Birthday Party (2015)

Theater 
A Guide for the Perplexed (2010)

Reception 
In their review of A Guide for the Perplexed, where Thalken had the role of Sheila, Variety wrote, "These are worthy, interesting characters, but the narrative never emerges from situation into story."

References

External links

 https://www.stewarttalent.com/profile/meg-thalken-chicago-filmtvtheatre-adults

Actresses from Washington, D.C.
American film actresses
American television actresses
Living people
Year of birth missing (living people)